The Muslim Literary Society was founded in 1916 and was based in Notting Hill, West London, with Koranic translator Abdullah Yusuf Ali as its president.

It is not to be confused with the American Muslim Literary Society or the Bengali Muslim Literary Society.

On 29 November 1917, the poet and novelist Marmaduke Pickthall, best known for his translation of the Koran, dramatically declared his conversion to Islam after delivering a talk on 'Islam and Progress' to the Society. There are no references to the Society after 1917.

External links
  "The historical roots of British Islam"
 "Muslims in London, Greater London Authority, October 2006"
 Islamic Society of Britain “Muslims of Britain”
 
"The Infidel within: Muslims from Britain since 1800", by Himayun Ansari. - Hurst, 2004

References

Organizations established in 1916
British literature